Mubarak Anber Aman Al-Ali  (born 1 January 1954) is a former Qatari football defender who played for Qatar in the 1984 Asian Cup.

He first played for Al Oruba, later to be known as Qatar SC, making his first team debut in 1971. He left in 1975 after the Al Oruba head coach, Hassan Osman, had transferred to Al Sadd and specifically requested the transfer of Anber as well, who he believed held high potential. He made his debut for the Qatar national team in the 1972 Gulf Cup. He served as captain of Al Sadd from 1977 till 1988, captaining them to a total of 6 Emir Cups, a record.

He retired from international football in 1984 after the 1984 Summer Olympics and from club football in 1988.

References

External links
Stats

Qatari footballers
Qatar international footballers
1954 births
Living people
Qatar SC players
Al Sadd SC players
Olympic footballers of Qatar
Footballers at the 1984 Summer Olympics
1984 AFC Asian Cup players
Qatar Stars League players
Association football defenders